Kyrgyzstan competed at the 2014 Winter Olympics in Sochi, Russia from 7 to 23 February 2014.

The country's delegation consisted of one skier, Dmitry Trelevski who was scheduled to compete in his second consecutive Winter Olympics. The team also consists of four officials. A total of $1,980 USD was earmarked to help support Trevelski in his preparations after he qualified. According to Nurdin Sultambayev, State Agency for Physical Education and Sport (GAFKS) spokesman, "winter sports are the most expensive out there" and Kyrgyzstan lacked the money to fund a larger team". However, on February 12 during training runs Trelevski was injured seriously, that he had to withdraw from the competition. The National Olympic Committee replaced Dmitry Trelevski with Evgeniy Timofeev after petitioning the International Olympic Committee.

Competitors

Alpine skiing 

According to the final quota allocation released on January 20, 2014, Kyrgyzstan had one athlete in qualification position.

References

External links 
Kyrgyzstan at the 2014 Winter Olympics

Nations at the 2014 Winter Olympics
2014
2014 in Kyrgyzstani sport